Stigmella quercipulchella is a moth of the family Nepticulidae. It is found in North America in Kentucky, Ohio, Pennsylvania, Illinois and Ontario.

There are two generations per year.

The larvae feed on Quercus species, including Q. palustris, Q. marilandica and Q. rubra. They mine the leaves of their host plant.

External links
Nepticulidae of North America

Nepticulidae
Moths of North America
Moths described in 1878